Riverside (also known as Lakeview) is a ghost town located in Forrest County, Mississippi, United States.

Riverside was named for its location on the south side of the Bouie River.

A large store once operated in the settlement.

References

Former populated places in Forrest County, Mississippi
Ghost towns in Mississippi